Oromus is a genus of scarab beetles in the family Scarabaeidae. There are at least two described species in Oromus, found in the Palearctic.

Species
These two species belong to the genus Oromus:
 Oromus alpinus (Scopoli, 1763)
 Oromus tragicus (Schmidt, 1920)

References

Scarabaeidae
Scarabaeidae genera
Taxa named by Étienne Mulsant